Lost City is an unincorporated community in eastern Hardy County, West Virginia, United States, on the Lost River. Lost City is centered at the intersection of West Virginia routes 59 and 259. The town was originally known as Cover. Its post office has been open since 1892.

The community takes its name from the nearby Lost River.

References

Unincorporated communities in West Virginia
Unincorporated communities in Hardy County, West Virginia